Ischyrhiza is an extinct genus of sclerorhynchoid ray from the Late Cretaceous and Early Paleogene. 

It had a large, toothed rostrum closely resembling that of a modern-day sawfish. Despite formerly being classified within a family of extinct sawfish-like rays known as Sclerorhynchidae, phylogenetic analyses indicate that Ischyrhiza, Schizorhiza, and Onchopristis form a distinct clade that groups closer with the extant family Rajidae, which contains the true skates, possibly rendering the suborder Sclerorhynchoidei paraphyletic.

Fossils of the genus have been found in Canada, the United States, the Aguja Formation of Mexico, the Bissekty Formation of Uzbekistan, the Tamayama Formation of Japan, the Dukamaje Formation of Niger, the El Molino Formation of Bolivia, the Quiriquina Formation of Chile, and the Chota Formation of Peru.

References 

Prehistoric cartilaginous fish genera
Cretaceous cartilaginous fish
Paleocene fish
Cretaceous–Paleogene boundary
Cretaceous fish of Africa
Cretaceous Niger
Fossils of Niger
Cretaceous fish of Asia
Fossils of Japan
Fossils of Uzbekistan
Bissekty Formation
Paleogene fish of North America
Paleogene United States
Cretaceous fish of North America
Cretaceous Canada
Fossils of Canada
Cretaceous Mexico
Fossils of Mexico
Cretaceous United States
Fossils of the United States
Demopolis Chalk
Prehistoric fish of South America
Late Cretaceous animals of South America
Cretaceous Bolivia
Fossils of Bolivia
Cretaceous Chile
Fossils of Chile
Cretaceous Peru
Fossils of Peru
Sclerorhynchoidei
Fossil taxa described in 1856